Kvitfjell is a ski resort in Norway, located in the municipality of Ringebu.

Developed for the 1994 Winter Olympics in Lillehammer, it is one of the most modern resorts in the world, with snowmaking on 80% of the alpine pistes. Based near the river Gudbrandsdalslågen, the resort offers 23 pistes: 5 green (nursery), 9 blue (beginner), 6 red (intermediate), and 3 black (advanced).

Alpine ski racing

1994 Winter Olympics
Kvitfjell is probably best known for hosting the men's and women's alpine speed events at the 1994 Winter Olympics.  Tommy Moe, an American of Norwegian descent, edged out home favorite Kjetil André Aamodt of Norway by 0.04 seconds in the downhill, then was edged out by Markus Wasmeier of Germany by 0.08 seconds in the Super G.

Katja Seizinger of Germany won the women's downhill with Picabo Street of the U.S. a distant second; Diann Roffe of the U.S. took gold in the Super G. The technical alpine events (giant slalom and slalom) were held at Hafjell.

World Cup
Kvitfjell is a regular stop on the World Cup circuit, hosting men's speed events late in the season, and debuted in March 1993. Designed by Bernhard Russi for the 1994 Olympics, the challenging Olympiabakken course is well-regarded; after the Olympics, men's World Cup races have been held here every year since, through 2020.

References

External links
  
 Piste Maps - Kvitfjell

Geography of Innlandet
Olympic alpine skiing venues
Ski areas and resorts in Norway
Venues of the 1994 Winter Olympics